Zulfiquar Memon (born 5 December 1977) is an Indian lawyer and the founder and Managing Partner of MZM Legal.

Early life and education
Zulfiquar was born in Mumbai. Zulfiquar is the son of criminal lawyer and EX-Member of Parliament of India, A. Majeed Memon.  Zulfiquar joined Government Law College, Mumbai in 1995 but left the law school to pursue international trade and commerce. 

Zulfiqar eventually finished his degree from Pune University in 2005 and in the same year he founded MZM Legal.

Zulfiquar completed his Post Graduation Diploma from NALSAR, Hyderabad in 2010 in ADR. In the years 2013 and 2018, Zulfiquar attended the prestigious Harvard Law School in Boston MA to complete his Masterclass in Negotiation and Conflict resolution.

Legal career 
Zulfiquar assisted his father, A. Majeed Memon in the Nadeem Saifee Extradition, which was won in the Bow Street Magistrate’s Court in London followed by the appeal in the High Court and the House of Lords.

Zulfiquar founded MZM legal in 2005. Some of his clients are Standard Chartered Bank, ICICI Bank, Kotak Bank, The Netherland-based Prins Autogassystemen BV, Singapore based Global Schools, Tarun Tejpal, M Pallonji and Co., MF Hussain foundation,  Kuwaiti Royal family,  Punj Lyod, Essar Group, United Phosphorus Limited (UPL), Tata Trusts  and Tata Sons.  .Zulfiquar has represented individuals like Rakesh Wadhawan and Sarang Wadhawan, Nirav Modi, Mehul Choksi, Dinesh Pandey – Bike Bot Scam, Airbus investigation, Rashesh Shah – Edelweiss. Zulfiquar also closely works with large private banks on compliance issues.

He is currently also a member of the International Bar Association, London Court of International Arbitration and International Chambers of Commerce (ICC). He is a member of the International Forbes Business Council, Young President’s Organisation (YPO)  and Entrepreneur’s Organisation (EO) 

Having vast legal expertise, he has been interviewed in the Legal500 for his works and frequently quoted in prominent media publications like BBC, Forbes, Bloomberg, Times of India, Economic Times, Hindustan Times, CNBC TV18 and Moneycontrol on various expert legal matters concerning Trademark Law, International Law, Banking, Cyber security etc.

Accolades 
Zulfiquar has been consistently ranked among the top individuals in India in the field of "White-Collar Crime" by Chambers & Partners. He has been recognized consecutively as a 'Top Ranked' Lawyer by Chambers & Partners Asia Pacific for the years 2016, 2017, 2018, 2019, 2020 & 2021. 

MZM Legal was a recipient of the 'Best White Collar Law Firm in India' by LegalEra-2017 and was recognized as the 'Criminal Law Firm of the Year 2019' at the Asian Legal Business India Law Awards 2019 by Thomson Reuters.The Firm has featured as the Top and recommended Firm on Who’s Who legal, Chambers and Partners and Legal 500.

In 2007, he was nominated and selected by the United States Embassy in India to be the only candidate to represent India for an International Visitor Leadership Program of the United States, Department of State. The program was on the United States Judicial System. Zulfiquar now holds the status of being an alumnus of the IVLP program – USA.

Personal life 
Zulfiquar is married to Suzanne Memon and has two sons, Mikaeel and Mishal.

References 

20th-century Indian lawyers
Living people
Businesspeople from Mumbai
1977 births